is a stratovolcano located in Akan National Park in Hokkaidō, Japan.

Geography and geology
Mount Oakan sits in the Akan caldera northeast of Lake Akan. There are three explosion craters at the summit. The volcano is made mostly from non-alkali mafic volcanic rock. The main rock type is andesite and dacite.

History
Mount Oakan emerged in the Late Pleistocene dropping pumice on Minamishikata. After that, continuous lava flows formed the bulk of the volcano. In the final stages of its life, a parasitic volcano formed a lava dome at the summit.

According to its name and local legend, Mount Oakan is the male counterpart to Mount Meakan on the other side of Lake Akan.

Notes

External links 
 Oakandake - Japan Meteorological Agency 
  - Japan Meteorological Agency
 Oakan Dake - Geological Survey of Japan
 Akan: Global Volcanism Program - Smithsonian Institution

Mountains of Hokkaido
Volcanoes of Hokkaido